Luke Anthony Procter (born 24 June 1988) is an English cricketer. He is a left-handed batsman and right-arm medium-fast bowler who captains Northamptonshire in first-class and ListA cricket.

Career
Born in Oldham, Greater Manchester, Procter played for Cumberland in the Minor Counties Trophy in 2007.

Lancashire
He first represented Lancashire in the Second XI Championship in 2006, made his List A debut in September 2009, against Warwickshire, opening the batting with Tom Smith, Procter scored 2 runs and suffered a broken thumb. Procter graduated from Lancashire's cricket academy, and after impressing for the Second XI in 2009 (the year he was granted a scholarship) he signed his first professional contract with the club.

In March 2010 Lancashire went to the Caribbean to prepare for the upcoming English season. In a friendly match against Yorkshire Procter suffered a broken left hand while fielding, preventing him from playing cricket for several weeks. He went on to make his County Championship debut in May that year against Warwickshire; he scored 13 runs in the first innings and bowled a single over but he was replaced by fast-bowler James Anderson for the second innings. Procter played one further County Championship match that year in September; he made scores of 19 and 32 and took his maiden first-class wicket, that of Nick Compton leg before wicket.

Procter's first County Championship match of 2011 was against Sussex in which he scored his first half-century. His innings of 89 runs from 170 balls included five sixes off the bowling of spinner Monty Panesar. He scored one further first-class fifty in 2011 and that year he played seven matches in the County Championship, which was more than he anticipated. Scoring 366 runs, Procter's average of 40.66 was the best for Lancashire in 2011. In the last match of the season, Lancashire won the County Championship for the first time since 1950 when they shared the title.

He replaced Will Young as captain for the 2023 County Championship and One-Day Cup.

References

External links

1988 births
Living people
English cricket captains 
Northamptonshire cricket captains 
English cricketers
Cumberland cricketers 
Lancashire cricketers
Northamptonshire cricketers
People from Oldham